The Marshall Gambit may refer to a number of chess openings named after the American chess master Frank Marshall.

The Marshall Gambit in the Scandinavian Defense. 1.e4 d5 2.exd5 Nf6
The Marshall Gambit in the Tarrasch Defense: 1.d4 d5 2.c4 e6 3.Nc3 c5 4.cxd5 exd5 5.e4
The Marshall Gambit in the Semi-Slav Defense: 1.d4 d5 2.c4 e6 3.Nc3 c6 4.e4 dxe4 5.Nxe4 Bb4+ 6.Bd2
Marshall Gambit in the Paulsen Variation of the French Defense, 1.e4 e6 2.d4 d5 3.Nc3 c5

Other chess moves
Marshall Attack, in the Ruy Lopez which also sacrifices a pawn, and can therefore be called a "gambit"
Marshall Defense,  in the Queen's Gambit Declined
Marshall Counterattack in the Sicilian Defense where after 1.e4 c5 2.Nf3 e6 3.d4, black plays 3...d5?!